Meridarchis is a genus of moths in the family Carposinidae erected by Philipp Christoph Zeller in 1867.

Species
Meridarchis alta Diakonoff, 1967
Meridarchis anisopa Diakonoff, 1954
Meridarchis bifracta Diakonoff, 1967
Meridarchis bryodes Meyrick, 1907 (from India)
Meridarchis bryonephela Meyrick, 1938
Meridarchis caementaria Meyrick, 1911 (from the Seychelles)
Meridarchis capnographa Diakonoff, 1954
Meridarchis celidophora Bradley, 1962
Meridarchis chionochalca Diakonoff, 1954
Meridarchis concinna Meyrick, 1913 (from India)
Meridarchis cosmia Diakonoff, 1954
Meridarchis creagra Diakonoff, 1949
Meridarchis cuphoxylon Diakonoff, 1954
Meridarchis drachmophora Diakonoff, 1950
Meridarchis ensifera Diakonoff, 1950
Meridarchis episacta Meyrick, 1906 (from Sri Lanka)
Meridarchis erebolimnas Meyrick, 1938
Meridarchis eremitis Meyrick, 1905 (originally in Tribonica)
Meridarchis excisa Walsingham, 1900 (originally in Propedesis)
Meridarchis famulata Meyrick, 1913 (from Sri Lanka)
Meridarchis globifera Meyrick, 1938
Meridarchis globosa Diakonoff, 1954
Meridarchis goes Diakonoff, 1954
Meridarchis heptaspila Meyrick, 1930 (from New Guinea)
Meridarchis isodina Diakonoff, 1989
Meridarchis jumboa Kawabe, 1980
Meridarchis longirostris Hampson, 1900 (originally in Pexinola)
Meridarchis luteus Walsingham, 1897 (originally in Autogriphus)
Meridarchis melanantha Diakonoff, 1954
Meridarchis melanopsacas Diakonoff, 1954
Meridarchis merga Diakonoff, 1989
Meridarchis mesosticha Bradley, 1965
Meridarchis monopa Diakonoff, 1948
Meridarchis niphoptila Meyrick, 1930 (from New Guinea)
Meridarchis octobola Meyrick, 1925
Meridarchis oculosa Diakonoff, 1954
Meridarchis oxydelta Diakonoff, 1967
Meridarchis picroscopa Meyrick, 1930
Meridarchis pentadrachma Diakonoff, 1954
Meridarchis phaeodelta Meyrick, 1906 (from Sri Lanka)
Meridarchis pseudomantis Meyrick, 1920
Meridarchis pusulosa Diakonoff, 1949
Meridarchis regalis Mey, 2007
Meridarchis reprobata T. B. Fletcher, 1920
Meridarchis scyrodes Meyrick, 1916 (from India)
Meridarchis scythophyes Diakonoff, 1967
Meridarchis theriosema Meyrick, 1928 (from Papua New Guinea)
Meridarchis trapeziella Zeller, 1867
Meridarchis tristriga Diakonoff, 1952 (from Myanmar)
Meridarchis unitacta Diakonoff, 1970
Meridarchis wufengensis Li, Wang & Dong, 2001

Former species
Meridarchis crotalus Diakonoff, 1989
Meridarchis xerostola Diakonoff, 1983

References

Clarke, J. F. Gates (1963). Catalogue of Type Specimen in the British Museum (Natural History) described by Edward Meyrick. 4 p. 50-60.

Carposinidae